World Council may refer to:

Politics and diplomacy
 World Business Council for Sustainable Development, an international environmental organization
 World Cultural Council, an international organization whose goals are to promote cultural values, goodwill and philanthropy among individuals
 World Food Council, a United Nations organization established by the UN General Assembly in December 1974
 World Future Council, an initiative started by Jakob von Uexkull
 World Happiness Council
 World Hereford Council
 World Peace Council, an Eastern Bloc anti-war conference
 World Water Council, an international collaboration of NGOs, governments and international organisations

Sports
 World Boxing Council, an international boxing organization
 World Dance Council, a governing body of competitive dance
 World Muaythai Council
 World Motor Sport Council, the governing body of all international motorsport activities
 World Sailing Speed Record Council, the body to confirm speed records of sailing crafts on water
 World Wrestling Council, one of Puerto Rico's two main professional wrestling promotions

Religion
 World Brahmo Council
 World Church Leadership Council (Community of Christ), a leadership body of the Community of Christ
 World Council of Churches, the principal international Christian ecumenical organization
 World Methodist Council, an association of churches in the Methodist tradition

Business and trade
 World Council of Credit Unions, a lobbying agency for credit unions
 World Diamond Council, representatives from diamond manufacturing and trading companies
 World Gold Council, gold mining companies
 World Petroleum Council
 World Plumbing Council
 World Travel and Tourism Council, people involved in the travel and tourism industry

See also
 World Affairs Council (disambiguation)
 World Buddhist Council (disambiguation)
 World Assembly